The 2020 CS Budapest Trophy was held in October 2020 in Budapest, Hungary. It was part of the 2020–21 ISU Challenger Series. Medals were awarded in the disciplines of men's singles, ladies' singles, and ice dance.

On September 10, 2020, the Hungarian National Skating Federation released the Hungarian government's COVID rules to which foreign competitors were required to adhere in order to gain entry to the country.

Only European skaters were entered for the event.

Entries 
The International Skating Union published the list of entries on September 29, 2020.

Changes to preliminary assignments

Results

Men

Ladies

Ice dance

References 

Budapest Trophy
CS Budapest Trophy
Budapest Trophy
International figure skating competitions hosted by Hungary